I'll Try Something New is the third album by The Miracles. It was released on the Tamla label, a subsidiary of Motown. The title track was an important early single for the group, featuring Smokey Robinson's lead voice, a chorus led by his wife Claudette and an orchestra of strings. Other hits like "What's So Good About Goodbye" and "I've Been Good To You" are included, plus three covers of easy listening standards: "I've Got You Under My Skin" written by Cole Porter, "On the Street Where You Live" from the Broadway musical My Fair Lady, and "Speak Low" by Ogden Nash and Kurt Weill, on which both Smokey and Claudette Robinson sing lead. I'll Try Something New also features a rare lead by Miracles baritone Ronnie White on "A Love That Can Never Be", and a lead by Claudette Robinson on "He Don't Care About Me".

This album is one of the few Miracles albums to feature the complete original six-member group lineup on its cover: Marv Tarplin, Claudette Rogers Robinson, Smokey Robinson, Bobby Rogers, Ronnie White, and Pete Moore.

Release
I'll Try Something New was released as a digital download through the iTunes Store. I'll Try Something New and four other Miracles albums were released on CD as part of the 2009 Motown 50th Anniversary limited edition CD release The Miracles – Depend On Me: The Early Albums.

In 2013 I'll Try Something New was given a standalone CD release.

Track listing

All lead vocals by Smokey Robinson except where indicated.

Side one
 "I'll Try Something New" (Smokey Robinson)
 "What's So Good About Goodbye" (Robinson)
 "He Don't Care About Me" (Robinson) (lead: Claudette Robinson)
 "A Love That Can Never Be" (Robert Bateman, Janie Bradford, Popcorn Wylie) (lead: Ronnie White)
 "I've Been Good to You" (Robinson)

Side two
 "Speak Low" (Kurt Weill, Nash Ogden) (lead: Smokey & Claudette Robinson)
 "On the Street Where You Live" (Frederick Loewe, Alan Jay Lerner)
 "If Your Mother Only Knew" (Robinson, Mickey Stevenson)
 "I've Got You Under My Skin" (Cole Porter)
 "This I Swear, I Promise" (Robinson, Bradford)

Personnel

The Miracles
 Smokey Robinson, Ronnie White, Claudette Robinson –  lead vocals
 Ronnie White, Bobby Rogers, Smokey Robinson, Warren "Pete" Moore, Claudette Robinson –  background vocals
 Marv Tarplin –  guitar

Other credits
 The Funk Brothers –  instrumentation

Producers
 Berry Gordy, Jr., producer
 Smokey Robinson, producer

References

Amazon Customer Review The Miracles "I'll Try Something New" CD

1962 albums
The Miracles albums
Tamla Records albums
Albums produced by Smokey Robinson
Albums produced by Berry Gordy
Albums recorded at Hitsville U.S.A.